Guilliam Visagie (born about 1751; still alive in 1793) was a trekboer who settled in southern Namibia about 1786. He is considered to have been the first person of European ancestry to have settled in the country.

Visagie was born about 1751 in the Dutch Cape Colony, likely to parents of Huguenot descent. He became a farmer in the area near the Olifants River. In 1780, he was found guilty of killing a Nama and wounding two others. To escape punishment by the authorities, he and his wife moved north of the Orange River.

In 1785, Guilliam and his wife Elsab Visagie settled in the area of today's Keetmanshoop, which he named Modderfontein (mud fountain), becoming the first Europeans to establish a permanent settlement in Namibia. The settlement was later renamed Swartmodder. Visagie farmed and traded firearms to the Namas for cattle. In 1793, he withdrew from his farm after a clash with Afrikaner Oorlams commandos, who were apparently acting on orders from the Dutch East India Company.

References

Afrikaner people
White Namibian people
South African emigrants to Namibia
South African people convicted of murder
People from the West Coast District Municipality
1751 births
Year of death uncertain